Deacybele is a genus of trilobites in the order Phacopida, that existed during the upper Ordovician in what is now Ireland. It was described by Whittington in 1965, and the type species is Deacybele arenosa, which was originally described under the genus Calymene by McCoy in 1846. The type locality was the Avoca Formation.

References

External links
 Deacybele at the Paleobiology Database

Encrinuridae genera
Fossil taxa described in 1965
Ordovician trilobites
Fossils of Ireland